Live in the USA is a live album recorded October 2002 and released in 2003 by rock band Mostly Autumn.

Track listing
"Nowhere to Hide" (Findlay, Josh) – 5:14
"The Spirit of Autumn Past" (Findlay, Jennings, Josh) – 6:54
"Evergreen" (Findlay, Josh) – 8:42
"The Last Climb" (Josh) – 9:15
"Winter Mountain" (Josh, Josh) – 6:38
"Shrinking Violet" (Findlay, Josh) – 8:18
"Dark Before the Dawn" (Faulds, Jennings, Josh) – 4:33
"Noise from My Head" (Findlay, Jennings, Josh) – 3:15
"Never the Rainbow" (Findlay, Jennings) – 4:50
"Please" (Findlay, Jennings, Josh) – 5:58
"Mother Nature" (Josh) – 15:03

Personnel
Bryan Josh – lead and backing vocals, lead and rhythm guitar
Heather Findlay – lead and backing vocals, acoustic guitar, tambourine, bodhrán
Iain Jennings – keyboards, backing vocals
Angela Gordon – flute, recorders, backing vocals
Liam Davison – rhythm and acoustic guitar, slide guitar, backing vocals
Andy Smith – bass guitars
Jonathan Blackmore – drums

Mostly Autumn live albums
2003 live albums